Five sharps may refer to:

B major, a major musical key with five sharps
G-sharp minor, a minor musical key with five sharps
The Five Sharps, a short-lived music group